Marri (also Romanized as Marrī and Marī) is a village in Kharturan Rural District, Beyarjomand District, Shahrud County, Semnan Province, Iran. At the 2006 census, its population was 35, in 10 families.

References 

Populated places in Shahrud County